John P. Touhy (April 19, 1919 – September 28, 1983) was an American politician.

Born in Chicago, Illinois, Touhy went to Campion High School in Prairie du Chien, Wisconsin and received his bachelor's degree from Georgetown University. He then served in the United States Army during World War II. Touhy then studied law at DePaul University College of Law and was a sales representative for McKay Construction Company in Bensenville, Illinois. From 1949 until 1971, Touhy served in the Illinois House of Representatives and served as speaker of the house in 1965. Touhy was involved with the Democratic Party.

Notes

1919 births
1983 deaths
Politicians from Chicago
Businesspeople from Chicago
Georgetown University alumni
DePaul University College of Law alumni
Speakers of the Illinois House of Representatives
Democratic Party members of the Illinois House of Representatives
20th-century American businesspeople
20th-century American politicians
United States Army personnel of World War II